The London 1883 chess tournament was a strong chess tournament among most of the leading players of the day. It was won convincingly by Johannes Zukertort (22 points out of 26) ahead of Wilhelm Steinitz (with 19 points). Remarkably, Zukertort was already assured of victory with three rounds to go, having scored an astonishing 22/23. He then lost his last three games against relatively weak players, probably due to exhaustion. The tournament established Zukertort as rivalling Steinitz to claim to be the best player in the world, and led to the World Chess Championship 1886 match between the two (the first official World Chess Championship match).  The event was a double round-robin tournament.  Marmaduke Wyvill contributed to organizing the tournament.

The tournament was also notable for the first use of the double-sided chess clock, invented and manufactured by Thomas Bright Wilson of Manchester Chess Club.

A common story relates to an incident that occurred at the tournament banquet, when the St. George Chess Club President proposed a toast to the best chess player in the world and both Steinitz and Zukertort stood up at the same time to thank him. Research by Edward Winter suggests that this story has been embellished. A game between Mason and Winawer was played, adjourned and resumed, but upon resumption the black knight on e7 was mistakenly placed on d7. Neither player noticed at the time and Winawer played the illegal, but powerful, Nc5! setting up a Ne4+ and eventually winning the match, with the mistake not being spotted until after the game concluded. It was not until days later that the mistake was noticed.

The tournament book was dedicated to Prince Leopold, Duke of Albany, for his patronage of the tournament.

Crosstable

The results and standings:

In this tournament a game ending in a draw was replayed at least twice. The third game after two draws would count, whatever the result. In the table, "+" indicates win by default, "-" indicates loss by default or unplayed game, "d" inicates a drawn game that was replayed and not counted towards the final score.

Skipworth withdrew from the tournament two games after the half way point; the remainder of his games were scored as losses. The final game between Rosenthal and Blackburne was not replayed as by that point it was clear that it would have had no impact on the final result of the tournament.

References

External links
 1883 London Tournament, Mark Weeks' Chess Pages

Chess competitions
Chess in London
1883 in chess
1883 in London
1883 in English sport
April 1883 sports events
May 1883 sports events
June 1883 sports events